Lin Bih-jaw (born 20 January 1949) is a Taiwanese politician who served as the Secretary-General to the President from May to October 2016.

Education
Lin obtained his bachelor's degree in diplomacy from National Chengchi University in 1970, master's degree in politics from University of Manchester in the United Kingdom (UK) in 1974 and doctoral degree in international politics from University of Wales in the UK in 1981. He later became the vice president of National Chengchi University.

Political career
Lin was appointed Secretary-General to the President in April 2016, and served under Tsai Ing-wen until 20 October 2016, a day after he had tendered his resignation. He cited his intention to resume writing as the main reason for his resignation.

Honors
 Order of the Rising Sun, 2nd Class, Gold and Silver Star (2020)

References

Political office-holders in the Republic of China on Taiwan
Living people
1949 births
Recipients of the Order of the Rising Sun, 2nd class